Pitelová is a village and municipality in Žiar nad Hronom District in the Banská Bystrica Region of central Slovakia. 

Villages and municipalities in Žiar nad Hronom District